Macrococcus brunensis is a species of bacteria belonging to the genus Macrococcus.

History

This species was described in 2003.

Description

The cells are coccoid, Gram-positive, catalase-positive, and oxidase-positive, with a diameter of 0.89–1.21 micrometres.

Epidemiology

This species was isolated from the skin of llamas (Lama glama).

Clinical

This species has not been associated with disease.

References

External links
Type strain of Macrococcus brunensis at BacDive -  the Bacterial Diversity Metadatabase

Staphylococcaceae
Bacteria described in 2003